Edric Thornton Bates MBE (3 May 1918 – 28 November 2003) was a former Southampton F.C. player, manager, director and president which earned him the sobriquet Mr. Southampton. Ted was the son of Eddie Bates, who played cricket for Yorkshire and Glamorgan and football for Bolton Wanderers and Leeds United. He was the grandson of Billy Bates who was one of the finest all-rounders for England in the early years of international cricket.

Playing career

Bates was born in Thetford and joined Saints on his 19th birthday in 1937, transferring from Norwich City. He soon forced his way into the first team as a centre-forward. His career was interrupted by the Second World War, during which league football was suspended in England. He initially joined the War Reserve police force, spending his time on guard duty at the Shell-Mex oil depot at Hamble or the Pirelli-General cable works at Woolston. In the early part of the war, Bates still managed regular appearances for Saints in the wartime cups and leagues.

On 8 June 1940, Bates married Mary Smith at St. James's Church in Shirley, and that evening watched Saints play Charlton Athletic at The Dell. Shortly afterwards the Bates' home was bombed and they moved to West Wellow, where Mary found work with the NAAFI. Bates resigned from the War Reserve and went to work at the Folland Aircraft factory at Hamble, who also had a very good works football team, Folland Aircraft F.C. which, as well as Bates, included other professional players such as Bill Dodgin (Southampton), Harold Pond (Carlisle United), Bert Tann (Charlton), Dick Foss (Chelsea), Bill Bushby, Cliff Parker and Bill Rochford (all Portsmouth). Most of these players also guested for Saints in the War leagues.

Bates' finest playing days came between 1947 and 1951 when he formed a great partnership with Charlie Wayman.

After some declining performances on the pitch, Bates made his last first-team appearance on 20 December 1952 at home to West Ham United. During his career he made 216 appearances, scoring 64 times.

Management

After retiring from playing he became a coach at Southampton in May 1953; advancing to manager in September 1955, taking over from George Roughton. Southampton were in the (then regional) Third Division South when he took over as manager. They were promoted to the national Second Division in 1960 when they finished as champions of the Third Division with Derek Reeves scoring 39 league goals, a club record.

Southampton were promoted to the First Division in 1966. Under his management, the team maintained their First Division status, developing young players such as Mick Channon and Ron Davies, and qualifying for European football in 1969 and 1971.

Bates decided to step down as manager in December 1973 and was replaced by Lawrie McMenemy. Bates acted as McMenemy's assistant for the next few years, which included Southampton's historic FA Cup victory in 1976. Bates was the first person to congratulate McMenemy and the players as the final whistle was blown at Wembley. He was manager for 18 years, a record for the club.

Honours

Bates then joined the Saints' board, where he would serve as a director for another 20 years before being appointed the club's president. He received the freedom of the city of Southampton in 1998 and was honoured with the MBE in the 2001 New Year Honours for services to Southampton Football Club.

Death

Bates was widely regarded as a local hero for his dedication to the club over a period of 66 years, and his death in November 2003 was widely commemorated by the club and supporters' community.

The first game after his death was the home match against Portsmouth in the League Cup and was the first derby between the two local rivals since an FA Cup match at The Dell in 1996. A minute's silence in Bates' memory barely lasted 30 seconds after jeers and boos from fans in the away end. Those who booed and jeered were widely criticised by the media and by fellow Portsmouth fans.

Ted Bates Trophy

In 2003 the Ted Bates Trophy was inaugurated with a match against Bayern Munich. It is an annual friendly match held in Ted's honour by the club he served so well, Southampton FC.

Statue controversy

A statue of Bates was unveiled outside the main entrance to St Mary's Stadium on 17 March 2007. The statue cost approximately £112,000 half of which was raised by fans via the Ted Bates Trust and the other half met by Southampton Football Club.

The statue was widely criticised by supporters just hours after its uncovering, for having tiny little arms and being a closer likeness to former Portsmouth F.C chairman Milan Mandaric than Bates, so the club pledged to organise a replacement. The replacement statue, by sculptor Sean Hedges-Quinn, was unveiled on Saturday 22 March 2008.

References

Bibliography

External links
Tribute on Southampton F.C. website

Details of Ted Bates Trust

1918 births
2003 deaths
People from Thetford
Association football forwards
English footballers
Norwich City F.C. players
Folland Sports F.C. players
Southampton F.C. players
English Football League players
English football managers
Southampton F.C. managers
English Football League managers
Members of the Order of the British Empire
Southampton F.C. directors and chairmen
Outfield association footballers who played in goal